Tomasz Konarzewski (17 July 1904 – 20 February 1974) was a Polish boxer who competed in the 1924 Summer Olympics. He was born in Sieradz and died in Łódź. In 1924 he was eliminated in the first round of the heavyweight class after losing his bout to Robert Larsen.

References

External links
Profile 

1904 births
1974 deaths
People from Sieradz
People from Kalisz Governorate
Heavyweight boxers
Olympic boxers of Poland
Boxers at the 1924 Summer Olympics
Sportspeople from Łódź Voivodeship
Polish male boxers